Neslen is a surname. Notable people with the surname include:

Arthur Neslen, British journalist and author
Charles Clarence Neslen (1879–1967), American politician
Florence Frandsen Neslen (1908–2000), American educator and painter

See also 
Neslen Formation, a geologic formation in Utah